Sinikka Marjatta Tyynelä, married Kontu (born 17 March 1954), is a Finnish middle-distance runner. She competed in the women's 1500 metres at the 1972 Summer Olympics.

References

1954 births
Living people
Athletes (track and field) at the 1972 Summer Olympics
Finnish female middle-distance runners
Olympic athletes of Finland
Place of birth missing (living people)